The Carolingian Saint Justin's Church in Frankfurt-Höchst is the oldest building in Frankfurt/Main and one of the oldest churches still existing in Germany. It is dedicated to Saint Justin the Confessor.

The Catholic basilica originates from around 830, and the late gothic chancel was built from 1441. The church stands at the east of the old part of the town Höchst, looking over the Main river.

On the one hand, St. Justin's is important for its stonework (the Carolingian capitals and the late gothic north doorway), and on the other hand, it is important as being one of the few nearly completely surviving early medieval churches - which has been continuously used for around 1200 years.

History of the church

The history of the church is closely connected with the city of Höchst founded in the 8th century as a daughter city of Mainz. The first well known documentary evidence of the city dates from 790.

Archbishop Odgar of Mainz (826-847) established the church of Justin the Confessor in Höchst, and his successor, Rabanus Maurus, made the final consecration in around 850. It did not really serve as a parish church then, but as a symbol for the power of the Electorate of Mainz proximate to the royal court at Frankfurt. The relics of St. Justin the Confessor were brought into the new church, where they remained for about 450 years.

A particular synod of Mainz was held at the church in 1024, and in 1090 it became a Benedictine monastic church of St. Alban's Abbey, Mainz, as well as a parish church. In 1298 the relics of St. Justin were transferred to the mother house, and the church consecrated to St. Margaret, though its dedication to St. Justin remains to this day.

In 1441 it became a monastic church of the Hospital Brothers of St. Anthony, because since 1419 it was only used as a parish church. The Antoniter order built the late gothic chancel and made numerous alterations. It ceased to be a monastic church after secularization in 1802.

St. Justin's was restored in the 1930s and 1980s and today belongs to the parish of St. Josef in the Frankfurt district of Roman Catholic Diocese of Limburg.

The Carolingian basilica

The original church was a six-bay basilica with three sanctuaries and apses at the east end. The entrance was originally at the west end of the central nave, but is now on the north side of the church at the northern sanctuary. The aisle windows have been replaced, and late gothic chapels were added on the north side. Also the apses were removed following the alterations.

The remainder of the Carolingian work is however intact: the two other sanctuaries, the central nave with small round-arched clerestory windows, the flat ceiling, the aisles, and at the top of the two sets of five columns - Corinthian capitals, which belong to the most important works of Carolingian art.

Late gothic additions
Up to the end of the affiliation with the Benedictine monastery of Saint Alban in 1419, the church had hardly changed structurally. In the 1420s the southern Carolingian sanctuary was replaced by a gothic Holy Cross chapel, in the place of today's vestry. To the northern aisle, three further chapels were added.

The high choir (chancel)

In 1441, the rules of the Augustinian choir master, under the Antoniter order, required a larger choir, and so a high choir (chancel) was built with a polygonal apsidal end and seven windows. The chancel was clearly higher than the original basilica, and this contrast is certainly visible today. The original vaulting in the chancel had to be taken down in 1523 due to danger of collapse, and is now replaced with a flat ceiling.

Due to the change in position of the entrance, a richly decorated pointed-arch north doorway was built in around 1442, which is flanked by statues of Paul of Thebes and Anthony the Great.

Construction which commenced in 1441 are the works of the so-called Frankfurt school, under the master builder Madern Gerthener. The most important builder in Höchst was Steffan von Irlebach, son-in-law of Gerthener, as well as the stonemason Peter Wale, who worked with Gerthener on the Frankfurt Cathedral tower.

References
Taken from the German Wikipedia article Justinuskirche

References cited in the German Wikipedia article Justinuskirche:
 Metternich, Wolfgang: Justinuskirche Frankfurt/Höchst. Schnell Kunstführer Nr. 1215, Munich/Zurich, 1980.
 Metternich, Wolfgang: Die Justinuskirche in Frankfurt am Main. Ein Bauwerk von nationaler Bedeutung. Verlag Waldemar Kramer, Frankfurt am Main, 1987,
 Haberland, Ernst-Dietrich: Madern Gerthener "der stadt franckenfurd werkmeister". Baumeister und Bildhauer der Spätgotik. Knecht, Frankfurt, 1992.
 Prestel Städteführer Frankfurt am Main, Munich, 1990.

External links (German)

 Church of St. Joseph
 St. Justin's Church
 Detailed representation St. Justin's Church with photos, sketches, historical reconstruction and bibliography.
 360° panorama of St. Justin's

9th-century churches in Germany
Roman Catholic churches completed in 1441
15th-century Roman Catholic church buildings in Germany
Roman Catholic churches in Frankfurt
Churches in the Diocese of Limburg
9th-century establishments in Germany
Carolingian architecture
Religious buildings and structures completed in 830